Neon is a spider genus of the jumping spider family, Salticidae. Its described species occur mostly in Eurasia, with some species found in North and South America. One species, N. convolutus, is also found in Algeria. Two species are known from Australia, N. australis and N. taylori. N. australis has palp morphology and fringing on its first pair of legs very similar to that seen in N. nojimai Ikeda 1995, from Japan.  N. taylori is most similar in morphology to N. sumatranus from Indonesia and N. kovblyuki from the Crimea and elsewhere. The genus is common and widespread in litter throughout Australia, from the highlands of Tasmania through the hot, dry inland to the wet tropics and includes many undescribed species.

Spiders in Neon are tiny to small, usually less than 5mm in body length. In the genus definition it says "Small unidentate spiders ranging from about 1.4 to 3.0mm in length." A precise definition of the genus was provided by Gertsch & Ivie (1955). Lohmander (1945) first established a subgenus Dicroneon for Neon levis (Simon). Neon reticulatus (Blackwall) and its relatives were assigned by Gertsch & Ivie to another subgenus, Neon.

The molecular phylogeny of the Salticidae developed by Maddison and co-workers places Neon in the Astioida and most closely related to the Australian-based Astiae radiation. It is possible as a consequence, that Neon is an originally Australian genus that has spread to other regions. However the only species of this genus sequenced (Maddison and Hedin 2003; Bodner and Maddison 2012), N. nelli, belongs within the subgenus Neon, unlike all the presently known Australian species that are more similar to members of the subgenus Dicroneon from the oriental region.

Species
, the World Spider Catalog accepted the following species:

Neon acoreensis Wunderlich, 2008 – Azores
Neon australis Richardson, 2013 – South Australia
Neon avalonus Gertsch & Ivie, 1955 – United States
Neon caboverdensis Schmidt & Krause, 1998 – Cape Verde Islands
Neon convolutus Denis, 1937 – Spain, France, Algeria
Neon ellamae Gertsch & Ivie, 1955 – USA
Neon kiyotoi Ikeda, 1995 – Japan
Neon kovblyuki Logunov, 2004 – Ukraine
Neon levis (Simon, 1871) – Palearctic
Neon minutus Zabka, 1985 – Korea, Vietnam, Taiwan, Japan
Neon muticus (Simon, 1871) – Corsica
Neon nelli Peckham & Peckham, 1888 – USA, Canada
Neon nigriceps Bryant, 1940 – Cuba
Neon ningyo Ikeda, 1995 – China, Japan
Neon nojimai Ikeda, 1995 – Japan
Neon pictus Kulczynski, 1891 – Southeastern Europe to Central Asia
Neon pixii Gertsch & Ivie, 1955 – USA
Neon plutonus Gertsch & Ivie, 1955 – USA
Neon punctulatus Karsch, 1880 – Bolivia
Neon rayi (Simon, 1875) – Southern, Central Europe to Kazakhstan, Israel
Neon reticulatus (Blackwall, 1853) (type species) – Holarctic
Neon robustus Lohmander, 1945 – Western Europe
Neon sumatranus Logunov, 1998 – Malaysia, Indonesia, New Guinea
Neon taylori Richardson, 2013 – New South Wales, Victoria
Neon valentulus Falconer, 1912 – Europe to Central Asia
Neon wangi Peng & Li, 2006 – China
Neon zonatus Bao & Peng, 2002 – Taiwan

References

External links

Photograph of N. levis
 Picture of N. nellii
 Bao, Y.-H. & Peng, X.-J. (2002). Six New Species of Jumping Spiders (Araneae: Salticidae) from Hui-Sun Experimental Forest Station, Taiwan. Zoological Studies 41(4): 403–411. PDF - includes Neon zonatus
 Richardson, B. J. (2013). New unidentate jumping spider genera (Araneae: Salticidae) from Australia. Zootaxa 3716: 460-474.  

Salticidae
Salticidae genera
Cosmopolitan spiders